Mohsen Chavoshi Hosseini (born 30 July 1979) is an Iranian Kurdish musician, singer, record producer and songwriter, based in Tehran. He has released ten albums, including a soundtrack to the 2007 film Santouri.

Early life
Chavoshi was born in Khorramshahr, Iran to a Kurdish family from Kurdistan province. His family migrated to Mashhad, where he also completed his education.

Career 
Chavoshi began his music career after he finished school and military service. His 2008 album Ye Shakhe Niloufar (a lotus sprout) received permission to be released legally. The CD became the biggest legally sold in Iran by selling over one million legal non-bootleg copies. In Yek Shakheh Niloofar, alongside his new producer, Chavoshi experimented with a new style that was more towards the rock music genre while including traditional Persian instruments. In 2010, Chavoshi made his new album Jakat (Jacket), which had many more up-tone, passionate melodies and lyrics. The album started with an upbeat melody in the style of "Bandari" with southern Iranian dialect, which caused a small shock to his listeners.

Chavoshi produced most of the songs on the album, while the professional producer Shahab Akbari produced two and Ahari produced three.

He released Greedy (his seventh album) in 2011. In 2012 Parcham-e Sefid (White Flag) was released by TDH Company as the fourth album of his career under the law. Also in 2012, Again Del Seda, the fourth Mohsen Chavoshi group album, was released by Besharat Company which contained one track of Mohsen, and it became a hit track. He released Man Khod An Sizdaham ('I Am The Thirteen') in 2013. Chavoshi released Paroye Bi Ghayegh ('Boatless Oar') in October 2014 and broke album sales records in Iran at 1393.
Mohsen Chavoshi is called Special Music Man in Iran.

Awards:

Personal life
Chavoshi has three brothers and two sisters. He was married in March 2009 and has a son named Zankow.

Discography 

†: The songs that failed to get permission from Ershad, which are included as bonus tracks in the VIP Edition of Abraham and released for free on digital music stores (later removed) and are circulated over the internet.

Albums 

 2019: no name 20.01'2020
 2018: Ebrahim (Abraham)
 2016: Amire Bi Gazand (Harmless Ruler)
 2014: Parouye Bi Ghayegh (Boatless Oar)
 2013: Man Khod An Sizdaham (I Myself Am The Thirteen)
 2012: Parcham-e Sefid (White Flag) (Released By TGP Company)
 2012: Del Seda (Sound of Heart) (The fourth Mohsen Chavoshi's group album, released By Besharat Company)
 2011: Santouri(Released By Irangaam Company)
 2011: Khas (The 3rd Mohsen Chavoshi's group album released By Avaye Farvahar Company)
 2011: Haris (Greedy) (Released By TDH Company)
 2010: Hasht (8) (The 2nd Mohsen Chavoshi's group album released by Honar Namaye Parsian Company)
 2010: Zhakat (Jacket) (Released By Iran Gaam Company)
 2009: Salam Agha (Hi, O'sir) (The First Mohsen Chavoshi's group album released By TDH Company)
 2009: Ye Shakhe Niloufar (A Lotus Sprout) (The First Official Album Of Mohsen Chavoshi that released By Avaye Barbad Company)
 2006: Moto'asefam (I'm Sorry)
 2005: Lenge Kafsh (A Shoe)
 2005: Khodkoshi Mamnou (Suicide Is Forbidden)
 2004: Nefrin (Curse)

Singles 

 01: Kashki
 02: Khod Faribi
 03: Rafighe Khoob
 04: Tohmat
 05: Shere Sepid
 06: Sange Sabour
 07: Haa
 08: Salam Be Solh
 09: Nakhlaye Bi Sar [2011]
 10: Zakhme Zaboon(live)
 11: Divare Bi Dar [2011]
 12: Deltang [2011]
 13: Lebase No [2012]
 14: Maame Vatan [2012]
 15: Metro [2012]
 16: Mahi Siah Kochouloo(for Azerbayjan quake) [2012]
 17: Vase Aberooye Mardomet Bejang (ft. Farzad Farzin) [2013]
 18: Khalije Irani/Iranian Gulf (ft. Sina Hejazi) [2013]
 19: Dooset Dashtam (I loved you)[2013]
 20: Hamsayeh (Neighbor) [2013]
 21: Beraghsa [2014]
 22: Cheshmeye Toosi [2014]
 23: In bood Zendegi (Lyrics By Hossein Panahi) [2014]
 24: Maadar [2015]
 25: Mina (folk) [2015]
 24: Bide Bi Majnon [2015]
 25: Hamkhaab [2015] (Shahrzad soundtrack)
 26: Be Rasme Yadegar [2015] (Shahrzad soundtrack)
 27: Kojai [2015] (Shahrzad soundtrack)
 28: Shahrzad [2015] (Shahrzad soundtrack)
 29: Afsaar [2016] (Shahrzad soundtrack)
 30: Ghalash [2016]
 31: Mah Pishooni [2016] (Shahrzad soundtrack)
 32: Khodahafezi Talkh [2016] (Shahrzad soundtrack)
 33: Divoone [2016] (Shahrzad soundtrack)
 34: Pesaram
 35: DelKhoon [2016]
 36: Zendan (Prison) [2017]
 37: Goldoon (FlowerPot) [2017]
 38: Fandake Tab Dar [2017]
 39: Bist Hear Arezoo (Twenty thousand wishes) [2017]
 40: Ey Darigha [2017] (Shahrzad soundtrack)
 41: In Bood Zendegi [2017]
 42: Havam Pase [2017]
 43: Kash Nadideh Boodamet [2017]
 44: Mariz Hali [2017]
 45: Amoo Zanjir Baf (Lyrics By Hossein Panahi) [2018]
 46: Jomee [2018]
 47: Delbar (Lyrics By Nezami) [2018]
 48: Del Ey Del (Lyrics By Baba Tahir) [2018]
 49: Khouzestan [2018]
 50: Seide Jegar Khaste (Lyrics By Rumi) [2018]
 51: Maslakh (Dubai) [2018]
 52: Che Shod (Lyrics By Shahriar [2018]
 53: Maleka (Lyrics By Sanai) [2019]
 54: Halalam Kon [2019]
 55: Naavak (Lyrics By Hafez) [2019]
 56: Joor Chin (Lyrics by Hossein Safa) [2019]
 57: Shabi Ke Mah Kamel Shod [2019]

 58: Sharhe Alef
 59: Ham Gonah (The accomplice)
 60: Zamire Khodsar [2020]
 61: Ou [2020]
 62: Taghe Soraya [2020]
 63: Shedatte Meydan [2020]
 64: Ali [2020]
 65: Hossein [2020]
 66: Abbas [2020]
 67: Gandom Goon [2021]
 68: Sale Bi Bahar [2021]
 69: Mahi Kenare Rood [2021]
 70: Asadollah [2021]
 80: Koja Boodi (Khosoof Series) [2021]
 81: Babe Delami (Khosoof Series) [2021]
 82: Adle Movasagh [2022]
 83: Ghashange Man (Amsterdam Series [2022]
 84: Postman (Aghrab‌e Ashegh Series) [2022]
 85: Yede Cheshme To Mioftam (Aghrabe Ashegh Series) [2022]

Awards 
 Award for the best soundtrack for Santoori Film from Kera International Filmfestival- 2008
 Award for the best Soundtrack for Santoori Film from Donyaye Tasvir ceremony- 2011
 Award for best Pop music composition, best Album (I myself am the thirteen), best Lyric and best Serie soundtrack from Musicema festival- 2013
 Award for best pop Music from Musicema Festival- 2015
 Barbad Award for the best pop Album for Harmless Ruler from Fajr Music Festival- 2016
 Honoring at the Rumi (Molana) Conference- 2016
 Award for the best pop Album for Harmless Ruler from Musicema Festival- 2017
 Award for Series music for Sayeban from JameJam TV Festival- 2018

Book 

Mohsen Chavoshi published his first book of poems called This Monster Love [2020]

See also 
 Music of Iran
 Khuzestan Province
 Santouri

References

External links

 
 
 Mohsen Chavoshi on Spotify
 RadioChavoshi | Full Archive For Play And Download

1979 births
Living people
Kurdish singers
Kurdish musicians
Iranian musicians
Iranian composers
Iranian songwriters
Iranian pop singers
Kurdish male singers
Iranian rock singers
Barbad award winners
Iranian male singers
Iranian pop musicians
Iranian rock musicians
Iranian Kurdish people
Iranian music arrangers
People from Khorramshahr
Persian-language singers
Iranian singer-songwriters
21st-century Iranian male singers
Iranian people of Kurdish descent